Welcome to My Living Room is a ballad written and sung by Carole King. It is featured on her 2005 album The Living Room Tour.  Aside from being a song, Welcome to My Living Room is the title to one of Carole King's concert DVDs. This DVD features songs that were performed during The Living Room Tour.

Welcome to My Living Room DVD
"Welcome to my Living Room" was filmed in Temecula, California in August 2005, with additional footage filmed in Sydney, Australia in November 2006.

While Carole King is a famous singer, songwriter, and pianist, she also plays the guitar during the DVD. "Welcome to My Living Room" features two backup singers, Rudy Guess (who also plays guitar and bass during the concert and was also musical director) and Gary Burr (who also plays guitar and bass during the concert). The DVD was directed by Carole King and Rudy Guess and produced by Carole King, Rudy Guess, and Lorna Guess.

"Welcome to My Living Room" features many well-known songs that Carole King helped write such as "Every Breath I Take" (Gerry Goffin and Carole King), "Go Away Little Girl" (Gerry Goffin and Carole King), "Hey Girl" (Gerry Goffin and Carole King), "Up on the Roof" (Gerry Goffin and Carole King), "Will You Love Me Tomorrow" (Gerry Goffin and Carole King), "I Feel the Earth Move" (Carole King) "It's Too Late" (Carole King and Toni Stern), (You Make Me Feel Like) A Natural Woman (Gerry Goffin, Carole King, and Jerry Wexler), "Locomotion" (Gerry Goffin and Carole King), and "I'm Into Something Good" (Gerry Goffin and Carole King) and also contains 25 minutes of bonus material that includes interviews with Carole King, Gary Burr, and Rudy Guess.

References

Carole King songs
2005 songs
Songs written by Carole King
Temecula, California